Metal Will Stand Tall is a 2006 album by The Poodles. The list of guest musicians and co-songwriters  are like Holly Knight, Mats Levén, Tommy Denader, Jonas Reingold and Marcel Jacob.

Track listing

Dancing with Tears in My Eyes is an Ultravox' cover

Personnel
Jakob Samuel - lead vocals
Pontus Norgren - guitars, backing vocals
Pontus Egberg - bass guitar, backing vocals
Christian "Kicken" Lundqvist - drums
Johan Lyander - keyboards, recording, mixing, producer, arrangements
Matti Alfonzetti - backing vocals, recording, mixing, producer, arrangements
Tess Merkel - vocals on "Metal Will Stand Tall"
Jonas Nerbe Samuelsson - vocals on "Song for You"
Anders Fästader - additional bass guitar on "Night of Passion"

Charts

Weekly charts

Year-end charts

References

2006 debut albums
The Poodles albums